DEA is an American reality television series that ran for fifteen, hour-long episodes in two seasons from April 2, 2008 to March 31, 2009 on the Spike television network. DEA follows the jobs of a squad of Drug Enforcement Administration special agents as they track down leads and make narcotics busts on houses suspected of selling, producing, or trafficking drugs. The first season was filmed in Detroit, Michigan and consisted of six episodes aired from April 2, 2008 to May 7, 2008. The second season in the New York/New Jersey area consisted of nine episodes aired from February 10, 2009 to March 31, 2009 and follows a group of DEA agents and Task Force officers operating out of the DEA's northern New Jersey headquarters located in Newark.  The show was produced for Spike TV by Al Roker Entertainment, Inc. in association with Size 12 Productions.

The first season follows DEA Group 14, while the second season follows a team of agents known as "Group 5-6", based at the DEA Newark Field Division office at 80 Mulberry Street, Newark New Jersey.

The series was narrated by Lance Henriksen.

Episodes

Season 1 (2008)

Season 2 (2009)

Reception
A review of show's debut by The New York Times described the series as "an argument that the trend of shows about real people doing their jobs ought to be put out of its misery", while crediting the show as "an extended public service announcement".

References

External links 
 2008 DEA series on IMDb
 DEA - Spike TV

2000s American crime drama television series
2008 American television series debuts
2009 American television series endings
Spike (TV network) original programming
2000s American police procedural television series
Television shows set in New York (state)